Cummertrees railway station was a railway station in Dumfries and Galloway south of Dumfries, serving the village of Cummertrees.

History 
The station opened in 1848. The station is now closed, although the line running through the station remains open. The station building has been converted into a private dwelling.

Cummertrees was opened by the Glasgow, Dumfries and Carlisle Railway, which then became part of the Glasgow and South Western Railway; in 1923 it became part of the London Midland and Scottish Railway at the Grouping, passing on to the Scottish Region of British Railways following the 1948 nationalisation of the railways. It was closed by British Railways in 1955.

An unstaffed siding at the station was closed 1 April 1959. A Cummertrees Lime siding existed nearby with a narrowgauge railway link to the Kellhead lime works.

The village of Cummertrees developed around the station.

The National Archives of Scotland hold a full collection of plans for the station of various dates.

The stylish and sizeable station buildings reflect the fact that the station served nearby Kinmount House, once seat of the Marquesses of Queensberry, described by Groome as "a beautiful edifice, built in the early part of the 19th century."

Powfoot Halt on the line towards Annan once served the Powfoot MOD Nitro-cellulose factory. 
Newbie Junction Halt railway station was another workers only halt that existed between 1898 and 1904 close to Annan where it served the factory workers of Cochran's & Co. boilers and the Newbie Brick and Tile works.

Services

References

External links
 Railscot website
 Railscot Intranet

Railway stations in Great Britain opened in 1848
Railway stations in Great Britain closed in 1955
Disused railway stations in Dumfries and Galloway
Former Glasgow and South Western Railway stations
1848 establishments in Scotland
1955 disestablishments in Scotland